The Husiatyn Synagogue (Festungs-Schule) is a former 16th-century synagogue in Husiatyn, Galicia, Ukraine.

The synagogue is a rare example of a Renaissance "fortress synagogue" built under the Polish–Lithuanian Commonwealth in 1654.

S. Ansky describes it as "one of the loveliest and most splendid in  Galicia." Omer Bartov describes the synagogue as "exquisite."

Damaged during and after World War II, in 1972 the standing ruin was renovated and turned into a museum. Today, the roof has collapsed and the building stands vacant.

See also
Center for Jewish History

References

External links

1920 
2007

Former synagogues in Ukraine
Jewish Ukrainian history
16th-century synagogues
Fortress synagogues